Nicole Wiggins Sancho (born 9 August 2000) is a Spanish handball player for BM Granollers  and the Spanish national team.

She represented Spain at the 2022 European Women's Handball Championship in Slovenia, Montenegro and North Macedonia.

On 23 December 2022, Wiggins signed a two-year contract with French OGC Nice Côte d'Azur Handball.

References

External links

2000 births
Living people
Spanish female handball players
Sportspeople from Madrid
21st-century Spanish women